The 1992 Coalite World Matchplay was a professional non-ranking snooker tournament that took place between 4 and 12 December 1992 in Doncaster, England. This was the final year the tournament was held.
  
James Wattana won the event, defeating Steve Davis 9–4 in the final.

Main draw

References

World Matchplay
World Matchplay (snooker)
World Matchplay
1992